"Dancing the Night Away" is the debut single by English rock band the Motors, which was released in 1977 as the lead single from their debut studio album 1. The song was written by band members Andy McMaster and Nick Garvey, and produced by Robert John "Mutt" Lange.

"Dancing the Night Away" peaked at number 42 on the UK Singles Chart and remained in the top 50 for four weeks. For its release as a single, the full six-and-a-half minute album version of the track was edited down to produce two separate edits for 7-inch and 12-inch formats.

Critical reception
In a retrospective review of 1, Mark Deming of AllMusic praised "Dancing the Night Away" as "superb" and "an excellent fusion of pop melody with big guitar firepower". He added that the song is "so effective that it sets a standard the rest of the disc can't quite match".

Track listing
7-inch single
 "Dancing the Night Away" – 3:13
 "Whisky and Wine" – 3:03

12-inch single
 "Dancing the Night Away" – 5:30
 "Whisky and Wine" – 3:03

Personnel
Motors
 Nick Garvey – lead vocals, guitar
 Bram Tchaikovsky – lead guitar, backing vocals
 Andy McMaster – bass guitar, backing vocals
 Ricky Slaughter – drums, backing vocals

Production
 Robert John Lange – producer

Charts

Cheap Trick version

American rock band Cheap Trick released a cover of "Dancing the Night Away" in 1983 as the lead single from their seventh studio album Next Position Please.

Todd Rundgren, who produced the majority of Next Position Please, originally advised Epic to release "I Can't Take It" as the album's lead single. The label were less enthusiastic about the song and suggested that the band record a version of "Dancing the Night Away". Produced by Cheap Trick and Ian Taylor, who had previously engineered the band's 1982 album One on One, "Dancing the Night Away" was released as the album's lead single, but failed to chart in the US.

Critical reception
In a review of Next Position Please, Evelyn Erskine of The Ottawa Citizen described "Dancing the Night Away" as "spunky and fun". Jim Bohen of the Daily Record was negative of the band's version, describing it as "regrettably ponderous and shrill".

Track listing
7-inch single
 "Dancing the Night Away" – 4:57
 "Don't Make Our Love a Crime" – 3:40

7-inch single (US promo)
 "Dancing the Night Away" (Long Version) – 4:57
 "Dancing the Night Away" (Short Version) – 3:50

12-inch single (UK release)
 "Dancing the Night Away" – 4:57
 "Ain't That a Shame" – 5:04
 "I Want You to Want Me" – 3:33
 "Surrender" – 4:37

12-inch single (US promo)
 "Dancing the Night Away" (Short Version) – 3:50
 "Dancing the Night Away" (Long Version) – 4:57
 "I Can't Take It" – 3:26

Personnel
Cheap Trick
 Robin Zander – lead vocals, rhythm guitar
 Rick Nielsen – lead guitar, backing vocals
 Jon Brant – bass, backing vocals
 Bun E. Carlos – drums, percussion

Production
 Cheap Trick – producers on "Dancing the Night Away", "Ain't That a Shame" and "I Want You to Want Me"
 Ian Taylor – producer on "Dancing the Night Away"
 Paul Klingberg – engineer on "Dancing the Night Away"
 Todd Rundgren – producer on "Don't Make Our Love a Crime" and "I Can't Take It"
 Tom Werman – producer on "Surrender"

Charts

References

1977 songs
1977 debut singles
1983 singles
The Motors songs
Cheap Trick songs
Song recordings produced by Todd Rundgren
Virgin Records singles
Epic Records singles
Songs written by Andrew McMaster (songwriter)